Hugo Prinsen Geerligs (born 16 December 1973 in Oss) is a Dutch bassist. He was the original bassist of The Gathering, and together they released seven studio albums, two live albums, and three EPs. After the release of Sleepy Buildings - A Semi Acoustic Evening in 2004, he left the band. In 2009 he agreed to participate in the band's 20th anniversary tour.

Discography
An Imaginary Symphony - Demo (1990)
Moonlight Archer - Demo (1991)
Always... (1992)
Almost a Dance (1993)
Mandylion (1995)
Adrenaline / Leaves - EP (1996)
Nighttime Birds (1997)
How to Measure a Planet? (1998)
if then else (2000)
Superheat - Live (2000)
Amity - EP (2001)
Downfall - The Early Years - Compilation (2001)
Black Light District - EP (2002)
In Motion - DVD (2002)
Souvenirs (2003)
Sleepy Buildings - A Semi Acoustic Evening - Live (2004)
Accessories - Rarities and B-Sides - Compilation (2005)

References

1973 births
Living people
Dutch heavy metal bass guitarists
People from Oss
Progressive metal bass guitarists
21st-century bass guitarists